Juan Manuel "Juanma" Lillo Díez (born 3 November 1965) is a Spanish football manager, currently in charge of Qatar Stars League club Al Sadd SC.

Having started coaching before his 20s, he was the youngest manager in charge of a La Liga club, having taken over Salamanca at not yet 30 years of age. He also coached Oviedo, Tenerife, Zaragoza and Almería in the top-flight, and had spells in charge of clubs in Mexico, Colombia, Japan, China and Qatar.

Coaching career

Early years and Salamanca
Born in Tolosa, Gipuzkoa, Lillo began coaching local Amaroz KE at just 16 and, four years later, he took charge of Tolosa CF in Tercera División. He moved to CD Mirandés also in that level afterwards, and led the side to promotion to Segunda División B in the 1988–89 season, as champions.

Lillo spent the 1991–92 campaign at Cultural y Deportiva Leonesa, advocating a 4–2–3–1 formation. He became the youngest coach to attain the national coaching badge in Spain.

Lillo made his name as a manager at UD Salamanca, joining the club in mid-1992 at the behest of its chairman Juan José Hidalgo. In his first season he finished second in the third level, narrowly missing out on promotion playoffs which he attained the following campaign without any major squad changes. This prompted reported interest from Real Valladolid, but the coach stayed until the end of 1995–96 as they competed in La Liga– this made him the youngest ever person to manage at the highest level, at only 29; after 28 games in charge, with Salamanca four points into the relegation zone, he was dismissed, but players and fans publicly opposed the sacking, supporting him in recognition of his achievements – the team finished in last position, eleven points behind 21st-placed CP Mérida.

Lillo then had some spells in the top division: in the 1996–97 season he worked with Real Oviedo, but was fired before its closure due to poor results. He returned to management in February 1998 with CD Tenerife, helping them avoid relegation in his first year; the following campaign, however, he did not see out the year, being sacked after 15 matches as the team were ultimately relegated.

After a year-and-a-half break, Lillo returned to take the reins of Real Zaragoza – the team had qualified for the UEFA Cup the previous season, and manager Txetxu Rojo moved to Athletic Bilbao. He set about fulfilling the task of progressing in the European competition and repeating European qualification through the league but did not achieve this, being relieved of his duties after barely three months.

2000s
Lillo did not return to coaching quickly: he worked as a sports commentator for television channel Antena 3, during its 2002 FIFA World Cup coverage. From 2003 to 2005 he coached in Segunda División, with Ciudad de Murcia and Terrassa FC, with little success (the Catalans were even relegated).

Lillo went to Mexico in 2005, joining Dorados de Sinaloa and resigning mid-season (the club would also eventually drop down a division). He insinuated that the team he was battling against to avoid relegation, Televisa-owned San Luis FC, had gained unusual victories against more powerful opposition, which were also owned by the Televisa group; this caused much controversy in both the Mexican press and football league.

Following the incident, Lillo spent the following two years away from football until he was appointed as the new head coach of Real Sociedad in April 2008, with the Basques in the second tier. Despite losing only once during his tenure he saw them fail to reach a promotion spot after finishing in sixth position, and was replaced by Martín Lasarte. 

In late December 2009, Lillo replaced Hugo Sánchez at the helm of struggling UD Almería, just one place above the relegation zone. After helping the Andalusian team finish 13th, his link was renewed for a further season. 

After a 8–0 home loss against FC Barcelona on 20 November 2010, Lillo was dismissed with the side in the relegation zone, and eventually being relegated after four years.

Abroad
After several years of inactivity, Lillo was appointed at Colombian club Millonarios FC in December 2013. He was fired on 2 September the following year, after four consecutive Primera A losses and elimination in the Copa Sudamericana.

On 8 October 2015, Lillo joined Jorge Sampaoli's staff at the Chile national team, being handed the role of handling the transition of players from the youth sides to the main squad. On 21 June 2017, after leaving Sevilla FC where he was working under the same manager, he was announced as the new coach Atlético Nacional in place of Reinaldo Rueda; he resigned from his position at the latter in December, after being eliminated by Deportes Tolima in the quarter-finals of the Categoría Primera A.

Lillo switched continents again in September 2018, joining Japanese J1 League club Vissel Kobe who had recently signed high-profile compatriot Andrés Iniesta. He resigned the following April with the team in mid-table, despite financial backing from Rakuten and the presence of other veterans such Lukas Podolski and David Villa. Remaining in the Far East, he took the helm at Qingdao Huanghai F.C. of China League One in August 2019, and won six of his first seven games as they rose from fifth place to guarantee promotion to the Super League; the side, who had Yaya Touré in midfield, finished the season as champions.

On 9 June 2020, Lillo was announced as new Manchester City assistant coach, replacing Mikel Arteta. He returned to head coach duties two years later, succeeding compatriot Javi Gracia at Qatar Stars League champions Al Sadd SC.

Honours
Mirandés
Tercera División: 1988–89

Salamanca
Segunda División B: 1993–94

Qingdao Huanghai
China League One: 2019

References

External links

1965 births
Living people
People from Tolosa, Spain
Sportspeople from Gipuzkoa
Spanish football managers
La Liga managers
Segunda División managers
Segunda División B managers
Tercera División managers
Tolosa CF managers
CD Mirandés managers
Cultural Leonesa managers
UD Salamanca managers
Real Oviedo managers
CD Tenerife managers
Real Zaragoza managers
Ciudad de Murcia managers
Terrassa FC managers
Real Sociedad managers
UD Almería managers
Liga MX managers
Dorados de Sinaloa managers
Millonarios F.C. managers
Atlético Nacional managers
J1 League managers
Vissel Kobe managers
China League One managers
Qingdao F.C. managers
Qatar Stars League managers
Al Sadd SC managers
Spanish expatriate football managers
Expatriate football managers in Mexico
Expatriate football managers in Colombia
Expatriate football managers in Chile
Expatriate football managers in Japan
Expatriate football managers in China
Expatriate football managers in Qatar
Spanish expatriate sportspeople in Mexico
Spanish expatriate sportspeople in Colombia
Spanish expatriate sportspeople in Chile
Spanish expatriate sportspeople in Japan
Spanish expatriate sportspeople in China
Spanish expatriate sportspeople in Qatar
Manchester City F.C. non-playing staff
Spanish expatriate sportspeople in England